Donga Ramudu and Party is a 2003 Indian Telugu-language comedy film written and directed by Vamsy. It stars Srikanth and Laya in the lead roles. The music of the film was composed by Chakri. The film released on 26 June 2003.

Plot
Rama Krishna (Srikanth) is a petty thief with his 4-member team that also includes a lady (Bhuvaneswari). He falls in love with a journalist Vasantha Lakshmi (Laya).

Then there is a village in Konaseema called Kotayyavaripalem. There used to be an illustrious gentleman called Kotaiah on whom the village is named after. His only daughter eloped with a guy she loved. Koataiah died later by writing a will that all his property should be passed on to the offspring of his daughter. He gave the responsibility of finding out the heir to a loyal man Somayajulu (Jaya Prakash Reddy).

Vasantha Lakshmi is sent on to investigate more about that village by the editor. Rama Krishna, who is running away from the impending police plans to pretend as the grandson of Kotaiah and enters Kotayyavaripalem. The rest of the story revolves around the point of Rama Krishna duping the village men and then reforming himself into a good human being with the help of Vasantha Lakshmi.

Cast

 Srikanth as Ramakrishna
 Laya as Vasantha Lakshmi
 Jaya Prakash Reddy as Somayajulu
 Bhuvaneswari
 Krishna Bhagavan
 Kondavalasa Lakshmana Rao
 Rallapally
 Tanikella Bharani
 Jyothi Lakshmi
 Mallikarjuna Rao
 Jeeva
 Melkote
 Bangalore Padma
 Suhasini

Soundtrack
Music by Chakri.
"Sirisiri Mallena" - S. P. Balasubrahmanyam, Sujatha
"Preme Panchami Vennela" - S. P. Balasubrahmanyam, Sujatha
"Chalirathiri Vastavani" - Srinivas, Sujatha
"Edo Edo Teeyani Daaham" - S. P. Balasubrahmanyam, Sunitha
"Kallallone Nuvvu" - S. P. Balasubrahmanyam, Sujatha
"Vannelunna Naari" - S. P. Balasubrahmanyam, Sujatha

References

External links
 

2003 films
2000s Telugu-language films
Films scored by Chakri
Films directed by Vamsy